Pir Ameer Ali Shah Jeelani is a Pakistani politician who has been a Member of the National Assembly of Pakistan since 26 February 2021.

Political career
He contested the by-election in constituency NA-221 (Tharparkar-I) on 26 February 2021 in which he was victorious.

References

Pakistani MNAs 2018–2023
Members of the National Assembly of Pakistan
Living people
Year of birth missing (living people)
Pakistan People's Party MNAs